Sirdar may refer to:
Sir Dar, Markazi Province, Iran
Sirdar-e Bala, Lorestan Province, Iran
Sirdar-e Pain, Lorestan Province, Iran